Harry Charles Purvis Bell, CCS (21 September 1851 – 6 September 1937), more often known as HCP Bell, was a British civil servant and the first Commissioner of Archaeology in Ceylon.

Early life
Born in British India in 1851, he was sent to England for his education at Cheltenham College.

Civil service career
Without going to university, Bell came to Ceylon as a civil officer in the Ceylon Civil Service and went on to serve as a customs officer. He thereafter served as a District Judge.

Archaeology
Appointed an official archaeologist, in July 1890 the Governor of Ceylon, Sir Arthur Gordon, appointed Bell as the first Archaeological Commissioner and Head of the Archaeological Survey of Ceylon. he carried out many excavations in Ceylon (now Sri Lanka) for the Archaeological Survey during an appointment running from 1890 to 1912 and claimed to dig treasures hidden in the Sigiriya and sent to England.

After retirement, he also investigated the archaeology and epigraphy of the Maldives, where he had been earlier in his life. and studied the linguistics of the Maldivian language. Bell had developed a good friendship with the king of the Maldives, who put his own royal schooner Fath-ul-Majid at his disposition to carry out archaeological research in certain atolls south of Malé.

More Information
Harry Charles Purvis Bell (1851-1937) was the son of a Major-General of Irish/Scottish descent, who was stationed in India. He was sent to England in 1864 for a public school education at Cheltenham College. After schooling, he did not enter University but spent two years tutored by a ‘Crammer’ who specialised in preparing students for the Civil Service examinations. He sat for the examination and passed it, being posted to the Ceylon Civil Service (CCS) in 1873. After several miscellaneous postings within the CCS, Governor Gordon appointed him in 1890 as the first Archaeological Commissioner and Head of the Archaeological Survey of Ceylon. Incidentally it was called a ‘Survey’ and not a department as the Government then believed that all items of archaeological interest could be completely surveyed in about twenty years and after that all operations could cease. Bell continued in the post of Archaeological Commissioner until 1912 when he retired after nearly forty years of service. Although during this period of time he was entitled to several paid furloughs in Britain, he never availed of them, preferring to spend his leave in  Ceylon. Bell was married to Renee Sabine Fyers, the daughter of A. B. Fyers, the eighth Surveyor General of Ceylon, they had three sons and three daughters. After his retirement he chose to live in Kandy, where he died in 1937.

Works
 
 The Maldive Islands. Report on a Visit to Málé, Colombo, 1921.

See also
Judiciary of the Maldives

Notes

Bibliography
 
 

1851 births
1937 deaths
People educated at Cheltenham College
British people in colonial India
Scientists from Kolkata
British archaeologists
Maldivian culture
British civil servants in Ceylon
20th-century archaeologists
Historians of Sri Lanka